Petra Martić and Maria Sanchez were the defending champions, but Martić chose not to participate. Sanchez partnered Elise Mertens, but lost in the semifinals to Verónica Cepede Royg and Marina Melnikova.

María Irigoyen and Barbora Krejčíková won the title, defeating Cepede Royg and Melnikova in the final, 7–5, 6–2.

Seeds

Draw

References 
 Draw

Abierto Tampico - Doubles